John Bassett Alley (January 7, 1817 – January 19, 1896) was a businessman and politician who served as a U.S. Representative from Massachusetts.

Early life 
John Alley was born on January 7, 1817, in Lynn, Massachusetts. He attended the common schools and Phillips Academy Andover. At the age of fourteen, he was apprenticed to work for a shoemaker and was released at nineteen.

In 1832, his parents, John Sr. and Mercy (née Buffum), and his younger sister Sarah joined the Church of Christ in 1832, later renamed the Church of Jesus Christ of Latter Day Saints. They moved to Nauvoo, Illinois, where Sarah was one of the first women to marry polygamously and became the first Mormon woman to bear a child as a polygamist.

In 1836, Alley moved to Cincinnati, Ohio and took a job freighting merchandise up and down the Mississippi River. In 1838, he returned to Lynn and entered the shoe manufacturing business. He established a hide and leather house in Boston in 1847.

Political career 
Alley served as a member of the Massachusetts Governor's Council from 1847 to 1851. In 1850, he served as member of the first Board of Aldermen of Lynn.

He represented Lynn in the State Senate in 1852 and as a member of the Massachusetts Constitutional Convention of 1853.

United States Congress
In 1852, Alley was a Free Soil candidate for U.S. Representative, but lost. 
He joined the new Republican Party and was elected to the Thirty-sixth and to the three succeeding Congresses (March 4, 1859 – March 3, 1867).
He served as chairman of the Committee on the Post Office and Post Roads (Thirty-eighth and Thirty-ninth Congresses).
He was not a candidate for renomination in 1866.
He became connected with the Union Pacific Railroad.

Later life and death
During the 1880s and 1890s, Alley was involved in a protracted lawsuit known as the Snow-Alley case which damaged his health and cost him a large part of his fortune.

He abandoned active business pursuits in 1886 and died in West Newton, Massachusetts on January 19, 1896. He was interred in Pine Grove Cemetery, Lynn, Massachusetts.

References

Bibliography

Barstow, Benjamin: Speech of Benjamin Barstow, of Salem, page 6, (1853).
History of Essex County, Massachusetts: With Biographical Sketches of Many of Its Pioneers and Prominent Men pages 360–361, (1888).
Hobbs, Clarence W.: Lynn and Surroundings, page 139, (1886).
Johnson, David Newhall: Sketches of Lynn, Or, The Changes of Fifty Years, pages 468–471, (1880).

1817 births
1896 deaths
Republican Party Massachusetts state senators
Massachusetts Libertyites
Massachusetts Free Soilers
Politicians from Lynn, Massachusetts
Businesspeople from Massachusetts
Republican Party members of the United States House of Representatives from Massachusetts
19th-century American politicians
Massachusetts Republican Party chairs
19th-century American businesspeople